Tsuperhero is a Philippine television action situational comedy series broadcast by GMA Network. Directed by LA Madrijeros and Rado Peru, it stars Derrick Monasterio in the title role. It premiered on November 13, 2016 replacing Ismol Family on the network's Sunday Grande sa Gabi line up. The series concluded on April 23, 2017 with a total of 23 episodes. It was replaced by Daig Kayo ng Lola Ko in its timeslot.

The series is streaming online on YouTube.

Premise
Nonoy, a jeepney driver turned superhero who has super strength and teleportation powers which came from an object, that came from the crashed spaceship of an alien from the planet Ganernia. Nonoy will eventually develops feelings for the barker Eva, and will eventually turn out to be his true love.

Cast and characters

Lead cast
 Derrick Monasterio as Nonoy / Tsuperhero
 Bea Binene as Eva / Tsupergirl

Supporting cast
 Gabby Concepcion as Sergeant Cruz
 Alma Moreno as Martha
 Valeen Montenegro as Jennifer
 Andre Paras as Pedro
 Philip Lazaro as Pedi
 Analyn Barro as Anna
 Betong Sumaya as Julius
 Jemwell Ventinilla as Choy
 Valentin as Polding
 Kuhol as Barker/Maku
 Gardo Versoza as Apo Amasam
 Miggs Cuaderno as Bokutox / Bok
 Benjie Paras as Makutox / Maku
 Rhian Ramos as Espie / Espirikitik
 Ina Raymundo as Bakite
 Gabby Eigenmann as Markano
 Terry Gian as Katipar
 Jacob Briz as Totorox
 Symon De Leña as Iskobotox
 Lexter Capili as Tom Tox
 David Remo as Kokorokotox

Guest cast
 Lou Veloso as Taong Grasa
 Arianne Bautista as Pinky Salcedo
 Juancho Trivino as Obet / Thunder Man
 Liezel Lopez as Isa
 Archie Adamos as Manager
 Ryan Yllana as Henry / Killer Clown
 Kim Belles as Daisy
 Lucho Ayala as Estong / Buhawi
 Kim Domingo as Erica / Ice Queen
 Rodjun Cruz as Ricky
 Mikael Daez as Han / Han Hangin
 Martin del Rosario as Cellphone Man
 John Feir as Andy
 Diego Llorico as Tikboy Kutsero
 Epy Quizon as Lamparaz
 Jeric Gonzales as Dannilo
 Michael Angelo as Samuel
 Pen Medina as Pikoy / Piccololo
 Jerald Napoles as Boy Takatak
 JC Tiuseco as Ahmed
 Ken Anderson as Budoy
 Katrina Halili as Gloria
 Vince Gamad as Kargador Zombie
 Rolando Inocencio as Kiko
 Erlinda Villalobos as Ising
 Jake Vargas as Demitri
 Kim Idol as Kanor 
 Will Devaughn as Echanted Tom

Ratings
According to AGB Nielsen Philippines' Mega Manila household television ratings, the pilot episode of Tsuperhero earned a 22.7% rating. While the final episode scored a 6.5% rating in Nationwide Urban Television Audience Measurement People in television homes.

Accolades

References

External links
 
 

2016 Philippine television series debuts
2017 Philippine television series endings
Filipino-language television shows
GMA Network original programming
Philippine comedy television series
Television shows set in the Philippines